Parliamentary elections were held in Iceland on 25 April 1987. The Independence Party remained the largest party in the Lower House of the Althing, winning 12 of the 42 seats.

Electoral reform
Prior to the election three extra seats were added to the Althing for Reykjavík (increasing representation from 11 to 14), one in the Upper House and two in the Lower House. The Hare quota replaced the D'Hondt method in the multi-member constituencies, although D'Hondt was still used for the compensatory seats.

Four constituencies elected five members each, two elected six members each, and one elected eight members, while Reykjavík elected 14. At least eight of the remaining nine seats were to be allocated to the constituencies before the election in order to reflect population. One seat could be allocated after the election, in order to help ensure proportionality across parties. A party threshold was introduced at the constituency level at two-thirds of a Hare quota; seats were eliminated one at a time and the threshold was then recalculated.

Results

References

Elections in Iceland
Iceland
Parliament
Parliamentary elections in Iceland
Iceland